Anthene rufomarginata is a butterfly in the family Lycaenidae. It is found in the Democratic Republic of the Congo (Ituri and north-eastern Tshopo).

References

Butterflies described in 1910
Anthene
Endemic fauna of the Democratic Republic of the Congo
Butterflies of Africa